The 1961–62 North Carolina Tar Heels men's basketball team was Dean Smith's first as the head coach at North Carolina. The 1961–62 team finished with an 8–9 overall record, despite a young and inexperienced roster. They tied for fourth in the Atlantic Coast Conference with a 7–7 record. Their season ended with a first round loss in the ACC Tournament to South Carolina. This was Dean Smith's only losing season as a head coach at North Carolina.

Roster

Pre Season
At the conclusion of the 1960–61 season, North Carolina, hired Dean Smith to replace Frank McGuire as head coach. McGuire was North Carolina Men's basketball Head Coach from 1953 to 1961, but was forced to resign by Chancellor William Aycock due to the program's placement on NCAA probation in 1960. Aycock, however, hired Smith, one of McGuire's assistants and who had been at North Carolina for two seasons already. Smith, who was only 30 at the time, was instructed by Aycock to run a clean program and represent the University well. Wins and losses were an afterthought to the Chancellor. However, in Smith's first season he was faced with a number of challenges, including a limited game schedule and the loss of two key players.

Prior to the start of the 1961 season, the ACC experienced a point shaving scandal. Four N.C. State players were accused of altering the score of several games and one UNC player was found to be involved with a gambler. As a result of this, the Dixie Classic  was abolished and William Friday, the President of the University of North Carolina system, also de-emphasized basketball by allowing only sixteen regular season games. Therefore, Smith was limited to only two games against out of conference opponents. Smith kept the two most challenging opponents on the schedule, Notre Dame and Indiana, both games which would be played in North Carolina, one in Greensboro and the other in Charlotte, respectively.

The 1961–62 squad should have included Ken McComb and Yogi Poteet, both projected starters, but they were ruled academically ineligible before the season started. This was a big blow for the Tar Heels since they also had to withstand the loss of two All-Americans, Doug Moe and York Larese, to graduation. As a result, Smith's first team was young and inexperienced.

Season summary
Dean Smith's illustrious career started on December 2, 1961, with a victory against Virginia in Chapel Hill. The Heels and Smith rolled to their first victory, defeating the Cavaliers 80–46. UNC won their next game at Clemson by a narrow margin, 54–52.  They split their next two games against out-of-conference opponents, Indiana and Notre Dame. Despite the betting odds in Notre Dame's favor, the Heels dominated the Fighting Irish, 99–80. Through January, the Heels had an accumulated a 6–2 record, but the rest of the season was not as successful. In February, they lost four straight games, all to Tobacco Road opponents (Duke, Wake Forest, and North Carolina State), before rebounding to win two of their last four games, with victories against Clemson and Maryland. Their season ended with a two-point loss to South Carolina in the ACC Tournament, which placed the Heels in a tie for fourth place with South Carolina in the final ACC standings.

Junior guard Larry Brown and senior center Jim Hudock led the Heels to an 8–9 overall record and a 7–7 ACC record. Brown averaged 16.5 points per game, eighth in the league, and shot 79.5% from the foul line, third in the league. Hudock averaged a double double over the season, with 14.9 points per game and 10.3 rebounds per game, fourth in the league. Both were named to the All-ACC Second team. Donnie Walsh led the ACC in field-goal percentage for the season, shooting 55.9% from the field.

Despite the challenges faced by Smith's first squad, he credits them as being one of the most hard-working teams in his 36 seasons at North Carolina. They also set North Carolina single-season record for highest field-goal percentage. However, they were the least successful, setting a record for most regular-season conference losses in a single-season (7) and their record against Tobacco Road opponents was only (1–5).

Post Season
Jim Hudock was drafted in the sixth round of the NBA by the Philadelphia Warriors, which ironically was coached by former North Carolina head coach, Frank McGuire. Donnie Walsh and former Tar Heel, Ken McComb were also drafted by the Warriors in the 11th and 10th round respectively. These former Tar Heels went on to enjoy limited success as players in the NBA. However, Donnie Walsh went on to enjoy various coaching stints in the NCAA and the NBA, before becoming the general manager of the Indiana Pacers for over two decades.  After a brief stint as President of the New York Knicks, Walsh returned to Indiana and now serves as a consultant for the team.

After Smith's first season, Adolph Rupp, Kentucky's head coach, called him requesting to set up a ten-year home-and-home series with UNC. Rupp demanded that North Carolina would play at Kentucky six times and home only four times. Despite North Carolina's disadvantage, the Heels won seven of those ten games.

Schedule and results

Season Statistics

References
 O'Hara, Michael E. University of North Carolina Men's basketball Games: A Complete Record, Fall 1953 through Spring 2006 North Carolina: McFarland, 2008.
 Smith, Dean. A Coach's Life. New York: Random House, 1998.
 Lucas, Adam. "Smith's First Five Teams To Reunite Tonight." Tarheelblue.com Retrieved on 2009-03-08.
 Carr, A.J. "Dixie Classic scandal left bad taste" News & Observer Retrieved on 2009-03-08.
 Inventory of the William B. Aycock Papers, 1942–2006, in the Southern Historical Collection, University of North Carolina at Chapel Hill
 NBA Draft 1962, in Hoopedia, NBA.
 Frank McGuire, in Hoopedia, NBA.
 Walsh Named Knicks President, Basketball Operations, in official Press Release from the NBA.

Notes

North Carolina Tar Heels men's basketball seasons
North Carolina
Tar
Tar